Damian Grichting (born 8 April 1973 in Leukerbad) is a Swiss curler.

Grichting plays in first position and is right-handed.

Teammates 
2002 Salt Lake City Olympic Games

Andreas Schwaller, Skip

Christof Schwaller, Third

Markus Eggler, Second

Marco Ramstein, Alternate

References

External links
 

1973 births
Living people
Swiss male curlers
Curlers at the 2002 Winter Olympics
Olympic medalists in curling
People from Leukerbad
Medalists at the 2002 Winter Olympics
Olympic bronze medalists for Switzerland
European curling champions
Swiss curling champions
Sportspeople from Valais